Robert Greene Hooks (March 13, 1907 – April 7, 1969)  was an American football player and coach. He was a halfback for the Georgia Bulldogs, a member of its 1927 "Dream and Wonder" team. Against Yale, he threw a 59-yard touchdown pass to Frank Dudley. He was selected All-Southern by football fans of the South through Central Press newspapers. One of the “Four Horsemen” of Georgia - Hooks, Dudley, McCrary and Johnson. He later coached the Mercer  Bears. In 1964, he was elected to the State of Georgia Athletic Hall of Fame.

Head coaching record

College

References

External links
 

1907 births
1969 deaths
American football halfbacks
Georgia Bulldogs football players
Mercer Bears football coaches
High school football coaches in Georgia (U.S. state)
All-Southern college football players